Robert Gordon Prizeman (28 February 1952 – 8 September 2021) was a British composer. He was born in the London Borough of Lambeth. He attended the Royal College of Music in South Kensington. Prizeman studied organ with Timothy Farrell and John Birch, and harpsichord with Millicent Silver.

In 1986 he composed the theme to Songs of Praise, which was published by Chester Music and Wilhelm Hansen, and from 1985 was the programme's musical director. The programme's theme was initially an organ composition.

He worked as a choirmaster from 1970. In 1984 his choir performed with Sal Solo in his arrangement. He founded the successful boys choir Libera in 1995, which is based in south London and records for EMI Classics. In 2010 he became an Associate of the Royal School of Church Music. He died on 8 September 2021.

References

External links

Video clips
 
 
  played at St Mary's Cathedral, Sydney
  played at Cherry Hills Village, Colorado

1952 births
2021 deaths
21st-century classical composers
Alumni of the Royal College of Music
English choral conductors
British male conductors (music)
English television composers
English male composers
People from the London Borough of Lambeth
English male classical composers
English classical composers
21st-century British conductors (music)
21st-century British male musicians